Rhinoscapha tricolor is a species of true weevil family. It occurs in Papua New Guinea.

References 

 Zipcodezoo
  Gwannon

tricolor
Entiminae
Beetles described in 1890